The Arts and Humanities Citation Index (AHCI), also known as Arts and Humanities Search, is a citation index, with abstracting and indexing for more than 1,700 arts and humanities academic journals, and coverage of disciplines that includes social and natural science journals. Part of this database is derived from Current Contents records. Furthermore, the print counterpart is Current Contents.

Subjects covered are the Arts, Humanities, Language (including Linguistics), Poetry, Music, Classical works, History, Oriental Studies, Philosophy, Archaeology, Architecture, Religion, Television, Theater, and Radio.

Available citation (source) coverage includes articles, letters, editorials, meeting abstracts, errata, poems, short stories, plays, music scores, excerpts from books, chronologies, bibliographies and filmographies, as well as citations to reviews of books, films, music, and theatrical performances.

This database can be accessed online through Web of Science. It provides access to current and retrospective bibliographic information and cited references. It also covers individually selected, relevant items from approximately 1,200 titles, mostly arts and humanities journals but with an unspecified number of titles from other disciplines.

According to Thomson Reuters, the Arts & Humanities Search, can be accessed via Dialog, DataStar, and OCLC, with weekly updates and backfiles to 1980.

Scholar Rainer Enrique Hamel has criticized the Arts & Humanities Citation Index for its poor reflection of scientific production in languages other than English. Also while analyzing solely content in Spanish of 2006 Hamel found the absurd situation that in the index there were more Spanish-language publications from authors based in the United States than from any other Spanish-language country.

History
The index was originally developed by the Institute for Scientific Information, which was later acquired by Thomson Scientific. It is now published by Thomson Reuters' IP & Science division.

Categories
 Archaeology
 Architecture
 Art
 Asian Studies
 Classics
 Cultural studies
 Dance
 Film, Radio, Television
 Folklore
 History
 History & Philosophy Of Science
 Humanities, Multidisciplinary
 Language & Linguistics
 Literary Reviews
 Literary Theory & Criticism
 Literature
 Literature, African, Australian, Canadian
 Literature, American
 Literature, British Isles
 Literature, German, Dutch, Scandinavian
 Literature, Romance
 Literature, Slavic
 Medieval & Renaissance Studies
 Music
 Philosophy
 Poetry
 Religion
 Theater

See also
 Science Citation Index
 Social Sciences Citation Index
 List of academic databases and search engines

References

External links 
  at Clarivate Analytics.
 Search in journal list at Clarivate Analytics (in the left panel check “Arts & Humanities Citation Index (AHCI)” under “Web of Science Coverage”)

Citation indices
Clarivate